Doomed Love (Portuguese: Um Amor de Perdição) is a 2008 Portuguese film directed by Mario Barroso.

Cast
 Tomás Alves 
 Ana Moreira 
 Rafael Morais 
 Patrícia Franco
 Willion Brandão
 Catarina Wallenstein
 Ana Padrão
 Rui Morisson
 Virgílio Castelo

Reception
It won the 2010 Portuguese Golden Globe for Best Film.

References

External links
 Official website
 

2008 romantic drama films
2008 films
Amor de Perdição
Films based on Portuguese novels
Films directed by Mario Barroso
Films set in Portugal
Portuguese romantic drama films
Golden Globes (Portugal) winners